Mumbai Diaries 26/11 is an Indian Hindi-language medical drama streaming television series on Amazon Prime Video.The series is directed by Nikhil Advani and Nikhil Gonsalves. Shooting has taken place in locations that were part of the 2008 Mumbai attacks including Chhatrapati Shivaji Terminus, Gateway of India and Leopold Café. The first season of Mumbai Diaries 26/11 released on 9 September 2021 on Amazon Prime Video platform.The show was renewed for a second season .

Synopsis 
Set during the 2008 Mumbai attacks, it follows the staff of Bombay General Hospital and their travails during the fateful night of November 26, 2008. It also shows incidents happening at the Taj Mahal Palace Hotel, and how a journalist tries to report all these incidents.

Cast

Main
 Mohit Raina as Dr. Kaushik Oberoi; Head of trauma surgery, Bombay General Hospital
 Konkona Sen Sharma as Chitra Das ; Social Services Director, Bombay General Hospital
 Tina Desai as Ananya Ghosh, Dr. Oberoi's wife, F & B Services Head of Palace Hotel
 Shreya Dhanwanthary as Mansi Hirani, a journalist
 Satyajeet Dubey as Dr. Ahaan Mirza, first year surgical resident, Bombay General Hospital
 Natasha Bharadwaj as Dr. Diya Parekh, first year surgical resident
 Mrunmayee Deshpande as Dr. Sujata Ajawale, first year surgical resident
 Mishal Raheja as Dr. Sahil Aggarwal, Visiting Surgeon, Chief of Ellora Hospital

Recurring
 Prakash Belawadi as Dr. Madhusudan Subramaniam, Chief Medical Officer, Bombay General Hospital
 Rishabh Arora as Vasu , Security Guard 
 Balaji Gauri as Nurse Sneha Cherian
 Pushkaraj Chirputkar as Nurse Samarth Joshi
 Sonali Kulkarni as Mrs. Kelkar, ATS Chief Anant Kelkar's wife
 Vikram Acharya as Rudro, Ananya's colleague
 Sonali Sachdev as Shamita Parekh, Dr. Diya's mother
 Aalekh Kapoor as Major Krishnan

Episodes

Reception 
The show has an critics' approval rating of 88% on review aggregator website Rotten Tomatoes. Bhavna Agarwal from Bollywood Bubble gave the web-series a rating of 3.5 stars out of 5 and wrote, "Mohit Raina, Konkona Sen Sharma starrer is an uplifting re-telling of the frightening terror attack. Mumbai Diaries 26/11 is undeniably a medical drama you won't regret seeing. It is attention-grabbing and impactful." Overall the show has received generally positive reviews.

Ronak Kotecha from The Times of India gave 3 out of 5 stars and noted "All in all, it's a hard-hitting show alright, made with a lot of blood and sweat too, which shows onscreen, but in a bid to pack in too much action and drama, Mumbai Diaries ends up becoming a never-ending saga of insipid characters rather than a taut thriller of a life-altering real event."

Anuj Kumar of The Hindu said "Overall, Mumbai Diaries 26/11 reads like a diary of a person who knows how to smartly conceal his real emotions."

Saibal Chatterjee from NDTV gave season 1, a rating of three and a half stars out of five and wrote "Mumbai Diaries 26/11 is undoubtedly top-notch in terms of both its craft and its creative choices."

Praising the performance of cast, The Indian Express reviewer stated "Mumbai Diaries 26/11 works best when, in between all the craziness, some of the characters stop to take a breath, and exchange glances or words. It makes you believe that there is still some goodness in the world."

References

External links

Amazon Prime Video original programming
2021 Indian television series debuts
Hindi-language web series
Works based on the 2008 Mumbai attacks
Indian medical television series
Indian drama web series
Television shows set in Mumbai
Television series set in 2008
Terrorism in television
Works about Islamic terrorism